Salma Khatun (born June 1, 1983) is the first female train driver of Bangladesh. She started work as Assistant Locomotive Master (ALM) of Bangladesh Railway in 2004.  Since she became the first female ALM with Bangladesh Railway, she has been joined by at least 14 more.

References

1983 births
Living people
People from Tangail District
Train drivers